Prince Michał Hieronim Radziwiłł (1744-1831) was a Polish nobleman, politician, diplomat and member of the Polish-Lithuanian Radziwill family. He was a Knight of the Order of the White Eagle (awarded on 7 September 1773) and a holder of the Order of the Black Eagle. His paternal great-grandfather was Dominik Mikołaj Radziwiłł.

Ordynat of Kleck, Olyka and Niasvizh, Great Sword-bearer of Lithuania from 1771, castellan of Vilnius from 1775, voivode of Vilnius Voivodship from 1790, Starost grabowski, komorowski, kraszewicki, and miksztadzki.

He was Marshal of Sejm (Partition Sejm, together with Adam Poniński) on 19 April 1773 - 11 April 1775 in Warsaw.

He was married to Helena Przeździecka from 26 April 1771.

Their son was nobleman Antoni Radziwiłł.

Biography
Son of mentally ill Marcin Mikołaj Radziwiłł and Marta née Trembicka, he was neglected until his father was incapacitated (which took place in 1748). His brother was the voivode Józef Mikołaj Radziwiłł.

He received a thorough education and married Helena Przezdziecka, known for her affair with King Stanisław August.

He was the owner of numerous goods, he became famous as a good farmer. During his rule, the ponds in the Przygodzice estates located near Ostrów Wielkopolski became one of the most significant in Poland and Europe. In Nieborów, he amassed a considerable collection of works of art, including paintings by Paulus Potter, Nicolas Poussin, Nicolas Lancret, Élisabeth Vigée-Lebrun.

He became the marshal of the Brześć in the Radom Confederation. In the attachment to the telegram of October 2 of 1767, to the president of the College of Foreign Affairs of the Russian Empire, Nikita Panin , the Russian envoy described him as the envoy responsible for the implementation of Russian plans at the Sejm of 1767, and the envoy of the Brest-Litovsk district to the Sejm of 1767. On October 23 of 1767, he joined the delegation of the Sejm, selected under the pressure of the Russian envoy Nikolai Repnin, established in order to define the system of the Republic of Poland. Marshal of the confederation of the  Grand Duchy of Lithuania established at the Partition Seym in Warsaw in 1773. As an MP in Brzesko-Lithuania, he was part of the delegation selected under the pressure of diplomats of the three partitioning countries, which was to carry out the partition. On September 18, 1773, he signed the treaties of assignment by the Polish- Lithuanian Commonwealth of lands seized by Russia, Prussia and Austria in the first partition of Poland . Member of Andrzej Mokronowski's confederation in 1776. Member of the Military Department of the Perpetual Council in 1783.

He signed the documents sanctioning the partitions in 1793 at the last partition parliament. He became a member of the Lithuanian Distribution Commission , established to liquidate the assets of the Jesuit order dissolved in the Republic of Poland. In the years 1773-1775, he collected 1,000 red zlotys a month from the common treasury of three partitioning manors. He was a member of the confederation of the Four-Year Sejm. He was included in the list of deputies and senators of the Russian envoy Yakov Bulgakov in 1792, which contained a list of people whom the Russians could count on in reconfederation and the overthrow of the work on May 3. At the Grodno Seym in 1793, he was appointed by King Stanisław August Poniatowski as a member of the deputation for dealings with the Russian  envoy Jakob Sievers. On July 22, 1793, he signed a treaty of assignment by the Republic of lands seized by Russia in the Second Partition of Poland. The Grodno Seym (1793) nominated him to the Permanent Council and the Commission of National Education.

In 1773 he was made a knight of the Order of Saint Stanislaus.

With the money he received from Russia for signing the partition acts, he bought the palace in Nieborów together with the surrounding land in 1774. Julian Ursyn Niemcewicz wrote about Michał that he was in the last way selfish, a bad citizen, inactive. In 1816, he also purchased the Królikarnia Palace.

In 1812 he joined the General Confederation of the Kingdom of Poland.

He had five sons, including Antoni Henryk Radziwiłł and Michał Gedeon Radziwiłł , and three daughters.

He died in Warsaw at the age of 87. He was buried in Nieborów  He was probably the last living secular senator of the Polish-Lithuanian Commonwealth.
Decorated with the Order of the White Eagle (1773), the Order of Saint Stanislaus (1773), the Prussian Order of the Black Eagle and the Order of the Red Eagle, the Bavarian Order of Saint Hubert , Knight of Malta from 1797

References

Secular senators of the Polish–Lithuanian Commonwealth
1744 births
1831 deaths
Michal Hieronim Radziwill
Voivode of Vilnius
Recipients of the Order of the White Eagle (Poland)